The Washington County Courthouse is located at 205 Putnam Street in Marietta, Ohio. The courthouse is constructed of rusticated stone blocks for the foundation with smooth blocks rising to the roofline. The courthouse is the third for the county. The courthouse was designed and constructed by Samuel Hannaford & Sons, the same architects on the Monroe County Courthouse. The courthouse is included in the Marietta Historic District which was added to the National Register on 1974-12-19.

References

External links
Official county website

Further reading
Thrane, Susan; Ohio County Courthouses; Indiana University Press; Bloomington, Indiana; 2000 
Stebbins, Clair; Ohio's Court Houses; Columbus Dispatch; Columbus, Ohio; 1980
Marzulli, Lawrence J.; The Development of Ohio's Counties and Their Historic Courthouses; Gray Printing Company; Fostoria, Ohio; 1983

Buildings and structures in Washington County, Ohio
National Register of Historic Places in Washington County, Ohio
Courthouses on the National Register of Historic Places in Ohio
County courthouses in Ohio
Government buildings completed in 1902
Clock towers in Ohio
Historic district contributing properties in Ohio
1902 establishments in Ohio